David Jardine Jardine  (4 August 1847, in Tinwald, Dumfries – 23 August 1922, in Lockerbie) was a barrister, landowner, big-game hunter, and owner of racehorses.

After education at the Edinburgh Academy from 1859 to 1864, David Jardine matriculated in 1867 at Trinity College, Cambridge, graduating there B.A. in 1872 and M.A. in 1875. He was in 1871 admitted to the Inner Temple and in 1874 called to the Bar, practising law on the South Eastern Circuit. After leaving the University of Cambridge, he travelled in India, Java, China, Japan, Australia, New Zealand, Tasmania, the United States, Canada, Egypt, and South Africa. He spent four years in India shooting big game. He served as Justice of the Peace in Dumfriesshire. As a racehorse owner, he won the Royal Hunt Cup at Ascot with "Refractor" in 1899 and the Northumberland Plate with "Sir Harry" in 1909.

In 1886 Jardine married Mary Angela Bright, a daughter of Sir Charles Tilston Bright. The marriage produced a son and a daughter.

References

1847 births
1922 deaths
People educated at Edinburgh Academy
Alumni of Trinity College, Cambridge
Fellows of the Royal Geographical Society
Scottish landowners